Tennis championship held in 1987.
Ivan Lendl was the defending champion but lost in the final 7–5, 6–2, 7–5 to Miloslav Mečíř.

Seeds

Main draw

Finals

Top half

Section 1

Section 2

Section 3

Section 4

Bottom half

Section 5

Section 6

Section 7

Section 8

References
 1987 Lipton International Players Championships Draw

Men's Singles